Dilip Mehta (born 1952 in New Delhi) is an Indian-born Canadian photojournalist and director. Mehta divides his time between New York City, Delhi and Toronto. His work as a photojournalist has appeared in The New York Times, Newsweek, National Geographic and Time. Mehta's five-year coverage of The Bhopal gas tragedy won him numerous prizes including the World Press award and Overseas Press award.

His directorial film debut The Forgotten Woman was inspired by his work on the set of Water. He directed Cooking with Stella (2009) and co-wrote the script with his sister Deepa Mehta. His 2016 documentary Mostly Sunny is a profile of Bollywood actress and former pornographic star Sunny Leone.

Filmography

Films

References

External links
 

1952 births
Canadian documentary film directors
Canadian Hindus
Canadian photojournalists
Canadian male screenwriters
Indian emigrants to Canada
Living people
People from New Delhi
20th-century Canadian screenwriters
20th-century Canadian male writers
21st-century Canadian screenwriters
21st-century Canadian male writers